Donna D. Shipton (born ) is a lieutenant general in the United States Air Force who serves as the military deputy to the Assistant Secretary of the Air Force for Acquisition, Technology and Logistics. She previously served as the deputy director and commander of the Space Force Element to the National Reconnaissance Office.

Education 
 1991 Bachelor of Science, electrical engineering, Clemson University, Clemson, South Carolina
 1995 Master of Business Administration, Chapman University, Orange, California
 1996 Undergraduate Space and Missile Training – Staff Course, Vandenberg Air Force Base, California
 1998 Squadron Officer's School, Maxwell AFB, Alabama
 2000 Master of Arts in organizational management, George Washington University, Washington, D.C.
 2005 Air Command and Staff College, Maxwell AFB, Alabama
 2005 Master of Space Systems, Air Force Institute of Technology, Wright-Patterson AFB, Ohio
 2008 Air War College, Maxwell AFB, Alabama, by correspondence
 2010 Master of National Security Strategy, National War College, Fort McNair, Washington, D.C.
 2014 The Program Manager's Course, Defense Acquisition University, Fort Belvoir, Virginia
 2017 The Executive Program Manager's Course, Defense Acquisition University, Fort Belvoir, Virginia

Military career 
Shipton received her commission in 1991 as a distinguished graduate of Air Force ROTC after graduating from Clemson University, majoring in electrical engineering. She also served as the Air Force program executive officer for tankers at the Air Force Life Cycle Management Center, where she was responsible for the planning and execution of all life cycle activities for the Air Force tanker fleet.

In June 2022, Shipton was nominated for promotion to lieutenant general and appointment as the military deputy to the Assistant Secretary of the Air Force for Acquisition, Technology, and Logistics.

Assignments 
 October 1992 – June 1996, project engineer and lead systems engineer, GPS Block IIF Satellite System, GPS Joint Program Office, Los Angeles Air Force Base, California
 July 1996 – July 1998, flight commander, Operating Division-4, NRO, Onizuka Air Station, California
 August 1998 – May 2000, student, Air Force Intern Program, Headquarters Air Force, the Pentagon, Arlington, Virginia
 June 2000 – June 2002, chief of Satellite Engineering and Operations Branch, Aerospace Data Facility – Colorado, NRO, Buckley AFB, Colorado
 July 2002 – June 2003, program element monitor, Advanced Reconnaissance Programs, Airborne Reconnaissance Division, Information Dominance Directorate, Assistant Secretary of the Air Force for Acquisition, SAF/AQI, the Pentagon, Arlington, Virginia
 June 2003 – May 2004, speechwriter, Under Secretary of the Air Force (dual-hatted as director, NRO), SECAF/CSAF Executive Action Group, Headquarters Air Force, the Pentagon, Arlington, Virginia
 June 2004 – June 2005, intermediate developmental education student, Air Force Institute of Technology, Wright-Patterson AFB, Ohio
 July 2005 – June 2007, deputy program manager and program manager, Advanced Space Control Demonstrations, Counterspace Group, Space Superiority Systems Wing, Los Angeles AFB, California
 June 2007 – June 2009, commander, Space Communications Operations Squadron, Communications Directorate, NRO, Los Angeles, California
 July 2009 – June 2010, secondary developmental education student, National War College, Fort McNair, Washington, D.C.
 June 2010 – July 2012, F-35 fleet manager, Logistics and Sustainment Directorate, Joint Strike Fighter Program Office, Arlington, Virginia
 August 2012 – April 2014, commander, Network Operations Group, Mission Operations and Communications Directorates, NRO, Chantilly, Virginia
 April 2014 – June 2015, senior materiel leader, Cryptologic and Cyber Systems Division, C3I&N, Air Force Life Cycle Management Center, Joint Base San Antonio-Lackland, Texas
 June 2015 – June 2017, senior military assistant, Assistant Secretary of the Air Force for Acquisition, SAF/AQI, the Pentagon, Arlington, Virginia
 June 2017 – June 2019, Air Force program executive officer for tankers, Tanker Directorate, AFLCMC, Wright-Patterson AFB, Ohio
 June 2019 – June 2020, vice commander of Space and Missile Systems Center, Los Angeles AFB, California
 June 2020 – August 2021, director of strategic plans, programs, requirements, and analyses, Air Force Materiel Command, Wright-Patterson AFB 
 August 2021–August 2022, Deputy Director and Space Force Element Commander, NRO, Chantilly, Va.
 August 2022–present, Military Deputy, Office of the Assistant Secretary of the Air Force for Acquisition, Technology, and Logistics, the Pentagon, Arlington, Va.

Personal life 
Shipton's husband is a retired Air Force officer.

Awards and decorations 
Shipton is the recipient of the following awards:

Effective dates of promotion

References

 

 
 

 
 

 

Living people
Year of birth missing (living people)
Place of birth missing (living people)
Space and Missile Systems Center personnel
United States Air Force generals
Female generals of the United States Air Force
Brigadier generals
Clemson University alumni
Chapman University alumni
George Washington University alumni
National War College alumni
Recipients of the Air Force Distinguished Service Medal
Recipients of the Legion of Merit